On August 3, 1949 the incumbent member of the French National Assembly from French Oceania, Georges Ahnne died. A by-election was held on October 22, 1949, to fill the vacant seat. The election was won by Pouvanaa a Oopa, who got 62% of the votes cast.

References

French Oceania
By-elections to the National Assembly (France)